Motorpsycho may refer to:

 Motorpsycho (band), a Norwegian rock band
 Motorpsycho (film), a 1965 film by Russ Meyer
 Motorpsycho Presents The International Tussler Society, a 2004 album by The International Tussler Society
 "Motorpsycho Nitemare", a 1964 song by Bob Dylan
 Motorpsychos, an American rock band

See also
 "Moto Psycho", a song on the 2001 album The World Needs a Hero by Megadeth